Radovan Sloboda (born 7 November 1982) is a Slovak professional ice hockey player who played with HC Slovan Bratislava in the Slovak Extraliga.

He also played for HK Skalica, HK Liptovský Mikuláš, HC Šumperk and MsHK Žilina.

References

1982 births
Living people
Slovak ice hockey defencemen
HC Slovan Bratislava players
Ice hockey people from Bratislava
Slovak expatriate ice hockey players in the United States
Expatriate ice hockey players in Romania
Slovak expatriate sportspeople in Romania
Slovak expatriate ice hockey players in the Czech Republic